Kemmannugundi (Red Soil Pit) is a hill station in Tarikere taluk of Chikkamagaluru district in the state of Karnataka, India. It is at the elevation of 1434m above sea level, with its peak at 1863m. This was the summer retreat of Krishnaraja Wodeyar IV, and as a mark of respect to the king, it is also known as Sri Krishnarajendra Hill Station. The station is ringed by the Baba Budan Giri Range, with cascades, mountain streams, and lush vegetation. Kemmangundi has ornamental gardens and mountains and valleys views.

History
Kemmannugundi (or Kemmannagundi) derives its name from three Kannada words - Kempu (red), mannu (soil) and gundi (pit).

Kemmannugundi was established as the summer retreat of Krishnaraja Wodeyar IV. He later donated this resort to the Government of Karnataka.  The Horticultural Department of Karnataka now develops and maintains the resort and its surroundings.

Landmarks
Z point is a vantage point at Kemmangundi and is reached by a steep uphill trek of about 45 minutes from Raj Bhavan. Shanthi Falls is on the way.

Krishnarajendra flower park and rock garden are maintained by the Horticultural Department of Karnataka. Many varieties of roses are cultivated there. Raj Bhavan guesthouse is located within the Krishnarajendra park.
Hebbe Falls: A downhill trek or SUV ride of about 8 km from Raj Bhavan lies Hebbe Falls where water streams down from a height of 168 meters in two stages to form Dodda Hebbe (Big Falls) and Chikka Hebbe (Small Falls).
Kallathi falls is about 10 km. from Kemmangundi. Water cascades from a height of 122 metres and the temple here is attributed to times of the Vijayanagar empire. According to a local legend, this place is associated with the Hindu sage, Agastya.
Mullayanagiri is the tallest peak in Karnataka and is known for the temple perched on the peak. 
Baba Budangiri is second tallest peak in Karnataka. It has a darga and Datta Peetha religious places. Manikyadhara falls and Galikere lake nearby are frequented by tourists.
Honnammana Halla falls near Attigundi and Hirekolale lake are popular with tourists.

Climate

Kemmanagundi has a Sub-Tropical Highland climate influenced by Monsoon. It has three seasons: Winter (Nov-Feb temp 24-12) followed by Summer (Mar-May 28-16) and Monsoon (June-Oct 22-15) and has a cooler climate throughout the year than most cities in the sub-continent. December is the coldest month with mean temperature of 17, and April is the hottest with a mean of 22.2. Most precipitation falls in July, with an average of 591 mm. February is the driest month.

Transport

Road
Kemmannugundi is 53 km from Chikkamagaluru, 17 km from Lingadahalli and 71 km from Shivamogga by road.  The nearest National Highways, NH-206 or NH-48, connect to Bangalore. There is another route via Mullayyanagiri and Attigundi, a scenic drive. If you are dependent only on public transport then you can catch a private bus from Lingadahalli at 9.30am and the same bus (last bus) comes at Kemmanagundi at 4.30pm goes to Birur via Lingadahalli.
Kemmannugundi is 212 km from Mangalore, and is accessible via road through National Highways, NH-73 and NH-173.

Rail
The nearest railway station is 33 km away at Tarikere, Birur& Kadur.

Air
The nearest airports are at Mangalore (212 km) and Bangalore (277 km).

Stay
Accommodation in Horticulture Department Guest House (known as Raj Bhavan), which provides a number of rooms, is availed by tourists. Also Kemmanugundi Hill Resort cottages managed by Jungle Lodges and Resorts are availed.
There is also a Horticulture Department Guest House in Kallathi village, where the Kallathi waterfalls are located.

See also

 Nandi Hills
 Malnad
 Chamundi Hills
 Kudremukh
 Nilgiris (mountains)
 Himalayas
 Kodaikanal
 Devaramane

References

Hills of Karnataka
Hill stations in Karnataka
Populated places in the Western Ghats
Tourist attractions in Chikkamagaluru district
Geography of Chikkamagaluru district